Division of Honour may refer to:

 Luxembourg Division of Honour, the second-level football league in Luxembourg
 Division of Honour (Belgium), the top-level league for women's volleyball in Belgium